Toad (Mortimer Toynbee) is a fictional character appearing in American comic books published by Marvel Comics. Created by writer Stan Lee and artist/co-writer Jack Kirby, he first appeared in The X-Men #4 (March 1964).

He is most often depicted as an enemy of the X-Men and was originally a hunchbacked mutant with superhuman leaping ability. He was Magneto's sniveling servant (or "toady") in the 1960s line-up of the Brotherhood of Evil Mutants. He eventually led his own version of the Brotherhood, which were more involved in petty crime than mutant liberation.

Since his inception, the character has appeared in numerous media adaptations, such as television series, films, and video games. For example, Ray Park played a significantly different version of Toad in 2000's X-Men film, and after that, aspects of this Toad have since been implemented into the comic book version. Subsequently, most versions of Toad written or drawn after 2000 resemble the Ray Park version more closely than the original Toad. A younger Toad appeared in the film X-Men: Days of Future Past, played by Evan Jonigkeit.

Publication history

Created by writer Stan Lee and artist/co-writer Jack Kirby, he first appeared in X-Men #4 (March 1964).

Fictional character biography

Lackey

Mortimer Toynbee was born in York, England, and was soon after abandoned by his parents and spent many years in an orphanage, where he was constantly tormented by other children due to his ugliness and strangely shaped body (as his mutant appearance was present from birth).  He was considered to be mentally inferior due to his extreme shyness and mild learning disabilities during his primary school years, though he was actually quite intelligent. He dropped out at an extremely early age and decided to fend for himself. Based on years of abuse and knowing full well he was a freak, Mortimer developed a severe inferiority complex, becoming servile to anyone that showed him the slightest bit of affection.

Later, he was recruited into Magneto's original Brotherhood of Evil Mutants, becoming Magneto's sycophantic "toady." Toad believed that Magneto loved him, while Magneto considered this henchman little more than a human shield and a useful lackey. Toad also developed a crush on his teammate Scarlet Witch, but she did not return his feelings as she was repulsed by his appearance, mannerisms, obsequiousness, and lack of hygiene.

As a member of the Brotherhood of Evil Mutants, Toad aided Magneto in repeated clashes with the X-Men. Magneto tried to use him to infiltrate the X-Men, but they recognized his power and unmasked him. At one point, Magneto and Toad were captured by the alien Stranger as part of his collection, encased in cocoons, and taken on a journey through space. Magneto managed to escape by repairing a spaceship but left Toad behind. When Magneto was re-captured by the Stranger, with whom Professor Xavier had telepathically communicated, he took Toad with him during his second escape, but by then Toad's attitude towards his master had already begun to change. Toad aided Magneto against the X-Men once more, but realized that Magneto didn't care at all for him, rebelled against Magneto, and fled his lair with Quicksilver and the Scarlet Witch.

However, he was soon captured by Sentinels and then freed by the X-Men. He was later captured with Quicksilver and the Scarlet Witch.

Solo career
Sometime later, Toad began to study the Stranger's technology, becoming familiar with it. He used the Stranger's alien technology to menace the Avengers. He even attempted to kill the Angel in a castle outfitted with traps by Arcade. However, he instead turned the castle into an amusement park and became its caretaker. Toad was eventually ejected from the castle by Doctor Doom, and he became suicidal, realizing that he was too dependent on others to work alone. He met and was befriended by Spider-Man, and teamed with Spider-Kid and Frog-Man as the superhero adventurer team, the Misfits. However, Toad suffered from constant depression.

Eventually, Toad left the Misfits and returned to villainy. He sought repeatedly to abduct the Scarlet Witch, but was thwarted by Quicksilver, the Vision and the Scarlet Witch. Much later, he played a "game" with Gideon and sought to enlist Proteus in a new Brotherhood. He then formed his own subversive version of the Brotherhood of Evil Mutants, along with Blob, Pyro and Phantazia. He transformed Karl Lykos back into Sauron and, with the Brotherhood, battled X-Force. Toad's Brotherhood also battled X-Factor and then fought Darkhawk, Sleepwalker and Portal.

X-Men: Forever
Years later, still struggling with depression, Toad was captured by Prosh, along with Juggernaut, Iceman, Jean Grey and Mystique as part of a time-hopping plan to stop a global threat. Toad learned that his deformed body was the result of experimentation by Juggernaut's father, Kurt Marko, at Alamogordo, New Mexico, which left Toad with an unstable genetic structure. The Stranger's equipment corrected his genetic flaws, resulting in an almost complete metamorphosis: Toad had a taller and slimmer appearance and had his powers augmented. Among the most notable changes was a prehensile tongue. Though his change improved his self-esteem, Toad continued to live life without direction. He joined several more incarnations of the Brotherhood of Mutants, none of which lasted for long.

Bloodsport tournament
Not long after, Toad entered the Madripoor Bloodsport Tournament. In his first fight in the tournament, Toad wrapped his extremely long tongue around the villain known as Eel, crushing his opponent's bones and seemingly killing him instantly. In the next fight, however, Toad battled Wolverine. His new abilities caught the X-Man off guard, and he managed to deal some damage. However, his overconfidence led to his defeat. Wolverine spared his life, not wanting to partake in the act of cold-blooded murder.

New X-Men
Toad made a brief reappearance on Genosha sometime after the island's annihilation, leading a team including Paralyzer and Unus to try to rebuild the statue of Magneto as a monument to him.

For reasons unknown, Toad eventually returns to Magneto's side during the Planet X storyline; however, Toad was not as docile and subservient as he had been in the past, even openly questioning Magneto at times. Magneto, in turn, is tyrannical in his treatment of Toad, who had become his second-in-command. At that point, the long-presumed-dead Magneto's image had taken a Che Guevara-like the notoriety, and Toad questioned whether Magneto may have been more powerful dead than alive. Nonetheless, Toad tries to defend his former master, only to be incapacitated by Fantomex, who shoots his kneecaps out. Shortly thereafter, Magneto is killed by Wolverine, and Toad vanishes from the scene.

It is later revealed that this was not the real Magneto, but a copycat named Xorn. It is unknown whether Toad was aware of this. It is revealed that the real Magneto is still alive. So far, Toad has made no known attempts to rejoin him. Unus' gang has come into conflict with Xavier and his allies, who have gained a foothold on Genoshan soil.

Civil War

Toad was among the group of mutants who broke out of the 198 camps, with help from Caliban, Domino, and Shatterstar. The group hid in what they believed was an abandoned nuclear bunker in the Nevada desert. While the X-Men and O*N*E battled outside the bunker, Johnny Dee was instructed by General Lazer to cause chaos amongst the 198. The group of mutants discovered this as Outlaw, being controlled by Johnny, pointed her gun at Domino. Domino's powers caused a misfire, giving Toad a chance to bring Outlaw down.

It was then revealed that the bunker was actually a blast-containment chamber for experimental weapons. As the auto-destruct sequence was initiated, Toad was trapped inside the chamber with the rest of the 198. The X-Men, teaming up with Bishop, Iron Man and Ms. Marvel, quickly found a way to rescue the trapped mutants and the 198 walked away unharmed.

Dark Reign
Toad has later seen rioting in San Francisco, angry about the fact that mutants have been forbidden to mate with each other to prevent new mutant births. Toad is faced by Cyclops and defeated. He is later seen being carried by Trance and Dragoness, who are being pursued by H.A.M.M.E.R. agents. After the battle is over, Toad is seen together with Dragoness and Avalanche living on the X-Men's new Utopia Homebase.

Second Coming
After Cyclops deputizes the population of Utopia to help fight an invasion of Nimrod Sentinels from an unknown future, Toad instructs a group of mutants, including Sack, to remain behind on the island, where they would be safe. In the middle of arguing with Sack, a Nimrod Sentinel fires on them, decapitating Sack and blowing off Toad's right index finger.

Regenesis
After the fight between Cyclops and Wolverine, the X-Men were divided between Utopia and Westchester. Toad decided to go to Westchester with Wolverine who accepts him as the school's janitor.

In the miniseries "Magneto: Not a Hero", Joseph is resurrected under unknown circumstances and forms a new Brotherhood of Mutants with Astra and mutated deformed versions of Blob, Mastermind, Quicksilver, Scarlet Witch, and Toad. It is soon revealed that the mutated versions of Blob, Mastermind, Quicksilver, Scarlet Witch and Toad are clones created by Joseph.

During the "Secret Empire" storyline, Toad became a member of New Tian's strike force following Hydra taking over the United States. He gained a secondary mutation where he can light his tongue on fire.

During the "Hunted" storyline, Toad was among the animal-themed superhumans captured by Taskmaster and Black Ant for Kraven the Hunter's Great Hunt sponsored by Arcade's company Arcade Industries. After most of the animal-themed superheroes regrouped, Toad mentioned that Man-Bull was killed amidst the chaos caused by the Hunter-Bots. Toad later assisted the animal-themed characters in fighting the Hunter-Bots. When Yellowjacket finds Black Ant hiding in the bush, Toad joins Yellowjacket, Human Fly, Razorback, and White Rabbit in preparing to take revenge on him only for Taskmaster to appear and make off with Black Ant.

In the very first issue of "House of X", when Professor X and Magneto founded a mutant-exclusive island nation on Krakoa. Toad was sent on a special mission with Mystique and Sabretooth to steal information about the Orchis Forge from Damage Control. Due to his hacking skills, they were successful and escaped, leaving Sabretooth behind to fight the Fantastic Four.

During "X-Men: The Trial of Magneto" the Scarlet Witch coaxed Magneto to strangle her to death with Uru as a part of her plan to resurrect fallen mutants whose minds were not backed up by Cerebro. The resurrected Scarlet Witch implicated Toad for her death as the Uru used for the murder was later found in his home. Pleading guilty to the murder charge, possibly as a favor to Magneto, he stated that he had killed her for turning her back on the Brotherhood and Magneto. Earning him banishment to the Pit of Exile, he claimed that he did it all for Magneto. Although the Scarlet Witch tried to advocate on the Toad's behalf, her words could not save him from his fate. He was eventually freed by Cypher along with all the other Pit inmates on the condition that they leave Krakoa and hunt down the recently escaped Sabretooth so he can be punished for his crimes.

Throughout "Sabretooth and the Exiles", Toad joins the other exiled mutants on a journey to find Sabretooth that leads to him joining them as they infiltrate a series of Orchis Mutant prisons and experimentation centers. Throughout most of this Toad keeps his head down and does not speak to anyone unless he has too but when they ended up in Station Three, which was somehow built inside the Astral Plane, Victor and Toad got into a fight about their mission to the Orchis Forge that led to him being put in the pit. When Toad tells him it was his own fault, Victor attacks him, they fight using special powers they have in the Astral Plane. Oya cuts them off because she discovered, someone trapped inside some kind of organic prison. Sabretooth and Toad fled, assuming the person to be hostile, but later Oya approached everyone and showed them that the prisoner was a second Vitor Creed.

Relationship with Husk

During the events of "Avengers vs. X-Men," Toad and Husk have developed a sentimental relationship. The relationship led to him quitting the Grey Academy to join her at the Hellfire Academy where she had become a teacher, but he soon finds he is relegated once again to being a janitor and sees Husk being twisted and corrupted by the Academy, quickly regretting that he joined.

In the Hellfire Academy, he found himself disillusioned with their attempts to teach the children how to be villains, feeling they should actually try educating them and tell them how unfortunate the life of a villain could be, which ended up with Husk shoving him out of the room and claiming he had embarrassed her. When he witnessed Quentin Quire - whom he had brought to the Hellfire Academy along with him - being tortured by Sauron, he finally took action and turned on the Hellfire Academy choosing to help Quentin escape. As they were escaping, they are attacked by Husk and the All-New Hellions. Husk's increasingly slipping sanity causes her to attempt to kill Toad during the fight. Despite his reluctance to hurt her, Toad begins to rip off layers of her flesh until she is left in her human form, confused about where she is and why she is not still in the Grey Academy, having apparently lost most of her memory. The Hellfire Academy is defeated, Kade Kilgore is trapped inside the Siege Perilous, and Wilhemina Kensington manages to escape, but Manuel Enduque and Maximilian Frankenstein are forced to enroll in the Jean Grey Academy. Toad is seen sitting beside Husk's hospital bed.

Later, it transpires Husk's unhinged personality was caused by a secondary mutation that caused her powers to affect her mind along with her body. Due to his earlier betrayal, Toad is fired by Wolverine as the janitor of the Grey Academy. As he leaves the school, Husk arrives to apologize to him. Toad accepts her apology and tells her he always knew things between them were too good to last. Before he can go, Husk asks him to visit her in a nearby coffee shop so she can try to get to know him and remember what she liked about him before she lost her memory. But Frankenstein creates self-replicating energy robots to attack the city and distract the staff so he and Enduque can escape the Grey Academy. Toad tracks them down and tells them how he was given a second chance and intends to take it. Frankenstein tells him to show him to prove his commitment, Toad does this by attacking and hospitalizing Enduque. Husk sits alone in the destroyed coffee shop and Toad never shows up, later she gives Enduque counselling and finds Toad left her a message saying he had to leave or else someday she would wake up and see him for what he really was. Toad is seen crying silently as he now works for Maximilian Frankenstein and recommends, they go someplace nobody can hurt them.

Powers and abilities
The Toad's intellect and physical abilities have gone through some changes over the years. In the character's inception, he possessed superhuman leg strength and endurance, agility, reflexes, coordination, balance, a superhuman ability to leap great distances. However, over the years, the Toad's original powers have increased, and he has gained additional powers through further mutation, including adhesive saliva and an elongated prehensile tongue.. As a result of further mutation, he now has mottled green skin and pointed-tip ears.

Toad's primary mutant ability is a superhuman leaping ability that allows him to leap many times higher and farther than an ordinary human. He possesses some degree of superhuman strength and endurance, primarily concentrated in his lower torso and legs, which grants him his superior leaping abilities. His vertebral column and skeletal structure are unusually flexible, enabling him to remain in a constant crouching position and contort his body into unusual position without injury or strain. In his first appearances, Toad had very little knowledge of hand-to-hand combat, fighting mainly by kicking wildly and by leaping about and attempting to land on his opponents (as Toad once weighed over 250 lbs this could be potentially harmful). Recently, he has demonstrated a better sense of combat and a leaner physique, using both his leaping ability and his elongated prehensile tongue to his advantage.

As a result of having his genetic structure restored (thus stabilizing and augmenting his mutation) Toad has the ability to extend his elastic tongue up to 25 feet in length to ensnare objects and people. His tongue is superhumanly strong and tough to the extent that he once killed a magistrate of Genosha by ensnaring him within his tongue and squeezing, causing the magistrate to be crushed to death almost immediately. He can also secrete odorless pheremonous venom and psychoactive chemicals from his tongue and fingertips that allow him to influence, manipulate, and control the minds of others to a limited extent. Thanks to special pads on his hands and feet, Toad can stick to and climb most surfaces with ease, even if they are vertical, inverted, or slick. He can also secrete a highly adhesive resin from his pores that paralyzes the nervous system of anybody that touches it. Toad has also demonstrated the ability to psionically communicate with amphibian life (which he often uses as spies), and to expel powerful gusts of wind from his lungs capable of knocking someone down.

Toad's intellect has increased beyond his original levels, and he has considerable knowledge of advanced technology and access to vast technological and scientific knowledge, which he gained as a lackey to Magneto and while he was held captive by the Stranger, as well as his studies of machinery in the possession of Arcade and Arkon. He once possessed alien technology that he stole from the Stranger's world, and could utilize it to create synthezoid robots, among other uses. He has demonstrated the ability to apply this advanced technology but lacks the creativity to make progress beyond his existing knowledge. For example, while he could construct and utilize a powerful exoskeletal armor, he would be unable to improve on its base design.

Although Toad's amphibian-like traits extend to his physical appearance, this was revealed to be contingent upon his mutation during the events in which the High Evolutionary deprived the world's mutant population of their extraordinary abilities. Following the events, Toad was revealed to be an extremely handsome young man. This is as he would look had he not been born a mutant.

Toad later gained a secondary mutation where he can light his tongue on fire.

Other versions

1602
Toad appears in the Marvel 1602 series working as a spy for Enrique (Magneto) in the Vatican.  As Enrique's plot was to recruit the "witchbreed" who could conceal their abilities in the unfriendly world, it is unclear why Toad was included, as he is shown with a long tongue constantly coming out of his mouth. He also has the ability to move around on walls and ceilings. When his deception is discovered by the Papacy, he betrays Enrique and his allies in exchange for his life. However, when Enrique's group breaks free, they capture Toad. Enrique promises to kill him, but his death is at least delayed, as he is seen alive on the ship later, though he doesn't appear in the climax.

Age of Apocalypse
In the Age of Apocalypse, Toad was a member of Forge's resistance group, the Outcasts. This version of Toad was a highly articulate Shakespearean actor, and a master swordsman. When the Outcasts were attacked by Domino, Toad killed her henchman Caliban but dies immediately afterward at the hands of Grizzly.

Marvel Noir
Toad (Mortimer Toynbee) is a mutant partner of homicide detective Fred Dukes in X-Men Noir.

House of M
When a mentally unstable Scarlet Witch warped reality into the mutant-dominant House of M, Toad appeared as a member of Wolverine's Red Guard, and wrote a best-selling book about his time in Magneto's service. When his real memories were restored, he agreed to help the heroes in changing the reality back to normal.

Marvel Zombies
During Marvel Zombies, Toad is seen as a zombie, along with several other members of the zombie Freedom Force chasing after the still living Blob. They succeed, as he is seen as a zombie in Dead Days.

Powerless
In the limited series Powerless where the characters of the Marvel Universe are ordinary humans, Toad, referred to simply as Mortimer or Mort, appears as member of the shadowy organization headed by Erik Lensherr. He briefly aids Victor Creed as they search for Weapon X, but they are attacked by their target and their car runs off the road.  Mortimer's fate is unseen, but Creed assumes Weapon X kills him.  He does not appear again.

Ronin
In the limited series X-Men Ronin, Toad is an elderly teacher that several of the X-Men turn to for help when the entire Prefecture are made to believe they are monsters. Toad works to help heal Wolverine, who had been laid low by a telepathic blast.

Earth X
In the Earth X reality, Toad gains Magneto's powers and rules over Sentinel City, humiliating Magneto as payback.

Ultimate Marvel

In the Ultimate Marvel continuity, Toad was a founding member of the Brotherhood of Mutants. In this version, he is not the sycophantic Toad from the mainstream universe, but rather is ruthless and vicious. This Toad is also British like the mainstream version but has four fingers, green skin and can walk on walls and ceilings like Spider-Man. He became good friends with Ultimate Cyclops, when they were in the Brotherhood together. This friendship carried on even after Cyclops returned to the X-Men.

After the supposed death of Professor Xavier and the consequent passing of control of the school to Cyclops and Jean Grey, Toad works as an instructor at the school, something with which Jean feels mildly uncomfortable. Cyclops asks Toad to visit the Morlocks and tell them of the new school regime that he is trying to create. Sunder, the Morlock leader had taken in Nightcrawler and believes the two to be working against him. Toad and Nightcrawler are then taken captive and then freed by Cyclops, Jean, Rogue, and Iceman.

After the Apocalypse debacle, Professor X returns to the institute.  The world outside has returned to how it was before Apocalypse appeared, but the mansion has both Cyclops' group who remained behind and Bishop's team of New X-Men together as a much larger team.  Toad officially joins the team and, like Iceman, wears a bandana with the "X" symbol on it.

Toad is then rarely seen in the Ultimate X-Men comic following this and is not even shown during the "Banshee Drug" storyline where Colossus makes an X-Men team of drug-enhanced X-Men to fight Xavier's X-Men. He is a part of Xavier's X-Men during the storyline but is not shown. The Ultimatum Wave then hits New York, prompting William Stryker to attack the X-Men mansion with his soldiers. Toad is killed defending Firestar in the resulting massacre.

Ultimate Toad's personality and appearance are more snarky British punk than subservient yes-man, and he has been shown as a relatively competent fighter in his few appearances. In the first story arc ("The Tomorrow People"), Toad successfully disables both Cyclops and Storm by leaping on them, but is defeated by Iceman, who freezes his legs. Storm then strikes him with a kick across the face.

Amazing Spider-Man: Renew Your Vows
On Earth-18119 as seen in the pages of Amazing Spider-Man: Renew Your Vows, Toad is seen as a member of the Brotherhood of Mutants.

In other media

Television
 Toad makes a cameo appearance in the Spider-Man and His Amazing Friends episode "The Prison Plot". This version is a member of Magneto's Brotherhood of Evil Mutants.
 Toad appears in X-Men: Pryde of the X-Men, voiced by Frank Welker. This version is an eager-to-please sycophant and member of Magneto's Brotherhood of Mutant Terrorists.
 Toad makes non-speaking appearances in X-Men: The Animated Series. In his first appearance, this version is a member of Solarr's mutant-supremacist group, the Children of the Shadow.
 A teenage incarnation of Toad named Todd Tolansky appears in X-Men: Evolution, voiced by Noel Fisher. This version is a misguided delinquent and member of the Brotherhood of Bayville who has a heavy Brooklyn accent and develops a rivalry with former classmate Nightcrawler. In a flash-forward depicted in the two-part series finale "Ascension", Toad and his fellow Brotherhood members have reformed and joined S.H.I.E.L.D.
 Toad appears in Wolverine and the X-Men, voiced by A. J. Buckley. This version is a member of the Brotherhood of Mutants who lacks combat experience.
 Toad appears in The Super Hero Squad Show, voiced again by A. J. Buckley. This version is a member of Doctor Doom's Lethal Legion.

Film

 Toad appears in X-Men (2000), portrayed by Ray Park. This version is a confident yet comedic member of Magneto's Brotherhood of Mutants who assists in his plot to build a machine capable of turning humans into mutants and fending off the X-Men before Toad is killed by Storm.

 A young Toad appears in X-Men: Days of Future Past (2014), portrayed by Evan Jonigkeit. In an interview, Jonigkeit stated, "I read a lot of the comic books. I found out the storyline of my character... X-Men fans will know that Ray Park played him in the first movie, so it's a generation story of how he came to be. It's really cool." He was formerly an American G.I. who is nearly taken into custody by Bolivar Trask as part of his anti-mutant efforts before he is rescued by Mystique and gets a job at a diner.

Video games
 Toad appears as an unlockable character in X-Men: Mutant Academy. This version is a member of the Brotherhood of Mutants.
 Toad appears as a non-playable character in X-Men: Mutant Academy 2. This version is a member of the Brotherhood of Mutants.
 Toad appears as a playable character in X-Men: Next Dimension. This version is a member of the Brotherhood of Mutants.
 An amalgamated incarnation of Toad appears as a mini-boss in X-Men Legends, voiced by Armin Shimerman. This version is a member of the Brotherhood of Mutants who resembles his Ultimate Marvel counterpart, but possesses the mainstream counterpart's history and personality.
 Toad appears as a playable character X-Men Legends II: Rise of Apocalypse, voiced again by Armin Shimerman. This version is a member of the Brotherhood of Mutants.
 Toad appears in the Game Boy Advance version of X-Men: The Official Game.
 Toad appears in X-Men: Destiny, voiced by Alexander Polinsky. This version is a member of the Brotherhood of Mutants.
 Toad appears as a boss in Marvel: Avengers Alliance. This version is a member of the Brotherhood of Mutants.
 Toad appears as a playable character in Lego Marvel Super Heroes, voiced by Greg Cipes. This version is a member of the Brotherhood of Mutants.
 Toad appears in Marvel Heroes.

Merchandise
 Toad received a figure in the Marvel Legends toy line.
 Toad received several figures in the X-Men film tie-in line.
 Toad received a figure in the X-Men: Evolution tie-in toy line.

References

External links
 

Characters created by Jack Kirby
Characters created by Stan Lee
Comics characters introduced in 1964
Fictional characters who can stretch themselves
Fictional frogs
Fictional henchmen
Fictional hunchbacks
Fictional people from Yorkshire
Fictional secret agents and spies in comics
Fictional taekwondo practitioners
Male characters in comics
Male characters in film
Marvel Comics characters with superhuman strength
Marvel Comics film characters
Marvel Comics male supervillains
Marvel Comics martial artists
Marvel Comics mutants
X-Men supporting characters